Pityopsis is a genus of North American plants in the tribe Astereae within the family Asteraceae.  Species of Pityopsis are known by the common names silkgrass or golden asters or grass-leaved goldenasters .

 Species
 Pityopsis aspera  – Pineland silkgrass - LA MS AL GA FL SC NC VA TN  
 Pityopsis falcata  – Sickleleaf silkgrass - ONT NY MA CT RI NJ FL 
 Pityopsis flexuosa  – Zigzag silkgrass - FL 
 Pityopsis graminifolia  – Narrowleaf silkgrass - Bahamas, Belize, Honduras, Chiapas, Oaxaca, Veracruz, Tamaulipas, United States (TX LA MS AL GA FL SC NC VA MD DE WV OH KY TN AR OK) 
 Pityopsis microcephala (Small) Small - FL  SC TX  
 Pityopsis oligantha  – Grassleaf goldaster - USA (TX LA MS AL GA FL) 
 Pityopsis pinifolia  – Taylor County goldaster - USA (AL GA SC NC) 
 Pityopsis ruthii  – Ruth's golden aster - TN

References

Asteraceae genera
Astereae
Flora of North America